Darantasia seria is a moth of the family Erebidae first described by Jeremy Daniel Holloway in 2001. It is found on Borneo. The habitat consists of coastal areas.

The length of the forewings is 9–10 mm.

References

Nudariina
Moths described in 2001